Coaley is a village in Gloucestershire.

Coaley may also refer to:

Coalfish